Australian Society for Sports History (ASSH) was formed in July 1983. The aim of the Society is to encourage discussion on the history of sport in Australia through research, publishing and events such as conferences and workshops.

Background
The Society was formed during the Sporting Traditions VI Conference held at the Melbourne Cricket Ground in July 1983. The inaugural President was Colin Tatz.

Presidents
1985-1987 Colin Tatz
1987-1989 Ray Crawford/John O’Hara
1989-1991 Wray Vamplew
1991-1993 Richard Stremski
1993-1995 Ian Jobling
1995-1997 Bill Murray
1997-1999 Braham Dabscheck
1999-2001 Roy Hay
2001-2003 Richard Cashman
2003-2005 Richard Cashman/ J. Neville Turner
2005-2011 Tara Magdalinski
2011-2013 Rob Hess
2013-2015 Murray Phillips
2015-2017 Gary Osmond
2017-2019 Marie-Louise McDermott
2019-2021 Matthew Klugman
2021-present Jane Hunt

ASSH Fellows
The ASSH Fellowship is presented to members and non-members who have made an outstanding contribution to the field of sports history, either in Australia or internationally. It is presented in recognition of the leading role that the recipient has played in developing and furthering the research interests of sports history
1993 - Wray Vamplew
1995 - Richard Cashman 
2003 - John O'Hara and Colin Tatz
2009 - Bill Murray
2017 - Rob Hess, Tara Magdalinski and Murray Phillips
2021 - Bernard Whimpress

Sporting Traditions Conference
ASSH biennially hosts a national conference called Sporting Traditions. The first Conference in 1977 was organised by Richard Cashman and Michael McKernan to bring together academics with an interest in the history of sport. The conference proceedings were published in the bookSport in history : the making of modern sporting history. Many papers presented at the Conference are published in the Society's journal Sporting Traditions.

Publications

Journals
The Society publishes two journals. Sporting Traditions is a biannual academic journal that has been published since November 1984. The inaugural editor was Wray Vamplew. It includes academic articles and book reviews. ASSH Bulletin is published on a regular basis and covers short articles and news.

ASSH Studies Papers
The Society publishes compilations of papers on a range of topics including specific sports, law, gender, Olympics and Indigenous Australians.

Oxford Companion to Australian Sport
The Society was responsible for creating the Oxford Companion to Australian Sport.  Most members of the Society provided entries on all aspects of the history of sport in Australia. The first edition was published by Oxford University Press in 1992 and updated in 1994. Contributing editors were Wary Vamplew, Katharine Moore, John O'Hara, Richard Cashman and Ian Jobling.

References

External links
Australian Society for Sports History website
Sporting Traditions 1984–2006 Fulltext Articles at LA84 Foundation Website
ASSH Bulletin 1985–2004 Fulltext Articles at LA84 Foundation website

Sport in Australia
History of sport in Australia
Sports organizations established in 1983
Sports governing bodies in Australia
Historical societies of Australia
1983 establishments in Australia